In hyperbolic geometry, the "law of cosines" is a pair of theorems relating the sides and angles of triangles on a hyperbolic plane, analogous to the planar law of cosines from plane trigonometry, or the spherical law of cosines in spherical trigonometry. It can also be related to the relativistic velocity addition formula.

History
Describing relations of hyperbolic geometry, it was shown by Franz Taurinus (1826) that the spherical law of cosines can be related to spheres of imaginary radius, thus he arrived at the hyperbolic law of cosines in the form:

which was also shown by Nikolai Lobachevsky (1830):

Ferdinand Minding (1840) gave it in relation to surfaces of constant negative curvature:

as did Delfino Codazzi (1857):

The relation to relativity using rapidity was shown by Arnold Sommerfeld (1909) and Vladimir Varićak (1910).

Hyperbolic laws of cosines

The first is an analogue of Euclidean law of cosines, expressing the length of one side in terms of the other two and the angle between the latter:

The second law has no Euclidean analogue, since it expresses the fact that lengths of sides of a hyperbolic triangle are determined by the interior angles:

Christian Houzel (page 8) indicates that the hyperbolic law of cosines implies the angle of parallelism in the case of an ideal hyperbolic triangle:

Hyperbolic law of Haversines

In cases where ”a/k” is small, and being solved for, the numerical precision of the standard form of the hyperbolic law of cosines will drop due to rounding errors, for exactly the same reason it does in the Spherical law of cosines. The hyperbolic version of the law of haversines can prove useful in this case:

Relativistic velocity addition via hyperbolic law of cosines 

In comparison, the velocity addition formulas of special relativity for the x and y-directions as well as under an arbitrary angle , where v is the relative velocity between two inertial frames, u the velocity of another object or frame, and c the speed of light, is given by

It turns out that this result corresponds to the hyperbolic law of cosines - by identifying  with relativistic rapidities , the equations in  assume the form:

See also

 Hyperbolic law of sines 
 Hyperbolic triangle trigonometry
 History of Lorentz transformations

References

External links 

 Non Euclidean Geometry, Math Wiki at TU Berlin

Hyperbolic geometry
Special relativity

es:Teorema del coseno#Geometría hiperbólica
fr:Théorème d'Al-Kashi#Géométrie hyperbolique
pl:Twierdzenie cosinusów#Wzory cosinusów w geometriach nieeuklidesowych